Sengri is the last name or family name of the people who hail from a place called "Sengiri" in South India. There are many other places with same name as Sengiri, for example in Orissa (a state in North India), in Tanzania etc., which have no bearing on the last name as referred to in this article. Many people use the short form Singri instead of Singiri. This creates another conundrum, a place in Iran is called Sengri. Sengiri is a small hamlet close to Vellore, a city in the state of Tamil Nadu in South India.

The most famous landmark in Singiri is the Singri Temple or Singri Kovil/Koil. This temple, built in the honor of Lord Lakshmi Narasimha, is over 1000 years old and was built by the famous south Indian king and stalwart Rajavarman, who was the chief at that time. The temple sits on a hillock and far away from everything as though to reflect the need for being away from the very things that tie us to this earth. The main deity is in sitting position and is imposing to look at. 

Though originated there, Singiri's and Singri's have spread all over the world. 

Indian surnames